Jesse Mogg (born 8 June 1989) is an Australian rugby union player who plays for the French Top 14 club Montpellier. His usual position is at full-back, though he can also play as a winger. Mogg previously played four seasons with the Brumbies in Super Rugby. He was capped for the Australian national team in 2013.

Family and early life
Mogg was born in Brisbane and attended St Patrick's College, Shorncliffe (the same school as notable Wallaby Drew Mitchell). In 2006 he represented the Australia A Schools rugby union side. He played colts rugby at the University of Queensland club. Mogg is distantly related to the former professional rugby league footballer, Adam Mogg

Rugby career
Mogg joined the North Brisbane Rugby Club in the Queensland Premier Rugby competition for two years, and was selected to play for Queensland A in 2008. He then switched codes to rugby league where he played in the Toyota Cup competition as a member of the Brisbane Broncos development squad in 2009.

Mogg joined the Brumbies rugby academy in 2011. Mogg made his professional rugby union debut for the Brumbies in the first round of the 2012 Super Rugby season against the Western Force in Canberra, scoring a try in a 19–17 victory. Mogg, a former high school track star, recorded a maximum speed of 10.06 metres per second during 2013 pre-season sprint testing with the Brumbies, making him one of the fastest players of any football code within Australia.

Mogg signed with French Top 14 club Montpellier for the 2015–16 season.

After six years playing in France, three with Monpellier before moving to Section Paloise, Mogg signed a two-year deal to return to the Brumbies for the 2022–23 seasons.

Super Rugby statistics

Honours
 2015–16 European Rugby Challenge Cup : winner (Montpellier).

Reference list

External links
Brumbies profile
 

1989 births
Living people
Australian rugby union players
Australia international rugby union players
Rugby union fullbacks
Rugby union wings
ACT Brumbies players
Canberra Vikings players
Rugby union players from Brisbane
Rugby league wingers
Rugby league fullbacks
Montpellier Hérault Rugby players
Australian expatriate rugby union players
Australian expatriate sportspeople in France
Expatriate rugby union players in France
Section Paloise players